The 2012 NACAM Rally Championship was the 5th season of the FIA's NACAM Rally Championship. This Championship is the FIA rally championship for the North America and Central America region.  The season began April 20 in Puebla, Mexico, and ended November 18 in Cartagena, Colombia, after 6 events.  Raúl Orlandini Griswold was at that date the reigning champion. Ricardo Triviño, 2009 champion, ran in the championship.

Report

Round 1: Rally Cañadas

Ricardo Triviño took the first round in Puebla. Nicolás Bedoya not completed the first stage. Francisco Name also abandoned in after the third stage. Triviño won the first six stages making an advantage of 1:37.0 over John Powell. Powell won the last stage, but he only can recover 22.8 seconds. Triviño took the first place in the Driver's Championship.

Round 2: Rally Montañas

The second round in Oaxaca started with Carlos Izquierdo taking the lead. Powell, Landazuri and Fernández not finished the first stage. Triviño lost near 10 minutes in this stage. However, Triviño won the next 8 stages reaching the fourth place in the NACAM classification. In the special stage 10 Name had abandon, Name been in the second position. Izquierdo won the last 3 stages, and took the victory.

Round 3: Rally Costa del Pacífico

Calendar

The original calendar had six rallies, two of them in Mexico. Panama was originally included as the venue of the fifth round, however, on March 7 this round was changed to Ecuador.

Teams and drivers

Results and standings

Results

Driver's Championship
Points are awarded to the top 10 classified finishers.  The best 5 of a driver's results count towards the championship.

Nations Cup
Points indicated rather than rally position.

References

NACAM Rally Championship
NACAM Rally Championship
NACAM Rally Championship
NACAM Rally Championship